Sainte-Marguerite-de-Carrouges (literally Sainte-Marguerite of Carrouges) is a commune in the Orne department in north-western France. As of 2019, the commune had a total population of 223 residents.

The commune is named for Marguerite de Carrouges (née de Thibouville; 1362, Château de Fontaine-la-Soret, Eure. Normandy – c. 1419), a French noblewoman and the wife of Sir Jean de Carrouges, Viscount of Bellême (c. 1330s, Carrouges, Normandy – 25 September 1396, Nicopolis, Ottoman Empire).

Sainte-Marguerite-de-Carrouges is located just a short distance north of the commune of Carrouges, the ancestral seat of the Carrouges noble family, which includes the Château de Carrouges.

See also
Communes of the Orne department
Parc naturel régional Normandie-Maine

References

Saintemargueritedecarrouges